June M. Eisland (born June 25, 1939) is an American politician who represented the 11th district of the New York City Council from 1979 to 2001.

References

1939 births
Living people
New York City Council members
New York (state) Democrats
20th-century American politicians
20th-century American women politicians
21st-century American politicians
21st-century American women politicians
Politicians from the Bronx
Women New York City Council members